The Flying Dogtor is an early Australian animated television series made by Crawford Productions between 1962 and 1964. It was shown on the Australian Television Network, which later became the Seven Network.

Its central character is a Great Dane who conducts a medical practice by aeroplane in outback Australia, similar to the Royal Flying Doctor Service.

The series was devised and written by the leading Melbourne architect Robin Boyd.

Characters
 The Great Dogtor Dane - the Flying Dogtor
 Granny Goanna
 Liz Lizard
 The bush children
 Colin Kanga
 Polly Possum
 Katie Koala
 Crafty Carson Carpetbag - the sneaky snake from Steamy Swamp
 Elvis Eagle - the bodgie bird
 Old Man Redback

Production
The show was produced by Hector Crawford. Cartoons were drawn by Joy Murray and Janice Male who studied together at Melbourne Technical College (now RMIT University). The cameraman was Ian Crawford. All characters' voices were read by Roly Barlee who was well known in Melbourne radio. Script and character advice was provided by Dr E.A. Murray, a lecturer in psychology, and Jean Lawson, a school counsellor.

The theme music was written and performed by Horrie Dargie and his quintet. Additional music came from a small 78 rpm record library, together with characters' voices, narration and some basic sound effects were added together to produce a master sound mix.

The animation technique was basically a moving plane running across the frame from left to right. The plane was about 5 inches high made of thick high quality art paper. It was pulled through by an electric motor in a machine that was also designed and built by Robin Boyd.

Episode list

 The Great Doctor Dane
 Crafty's Secret Hideout
 Fire!
 Fireworks

References
 Helleur, I. "A canine Kildare is star of TV series", PIX, 8 August 1964.
 The National Collection. National Film and Sound Archive. 17 April 2007 <http://colsearch.nfsa.afc.gov.au/>

External links
 The Flying Dogtor at the National Film and Sound Archive

Seven Network original programming
Australian children's animated television series
Aviation television series
1962 Australian television series debuts
1964 Australian television series endings
Animated television series about dogs
Black-and-white Australian television shows